The 1953 West Virginia Mountaineers football team was an American football team that represented West Virginia University in the Southern Conference (SoCon) during the 1953 college football season. Led by fourth-year head coach Art Lewis, the Mountaineers compiled an overall record of 8–2 with a mark of 4–0 in conference play, winning the SoCon title. West Virginia was invited to the Sugar Bowl, where the Mountaineers lost to Georgia Tech, 42–19.

Schedule

Roster

References

West Virginia
West Virginia Mountaineers football seasons
Southern Conference football champion seasons
West Virginia Mountaineers football